Las Monjas is a subbarrio, a legal subdivision of Hato Rey Central, a barrio in San Juan, Puerto Rico.

References

Hato Rey, Puerto Rico
Municipality of San Juan